Amber Road, Inc. was a US-based software company specializing in Global Trade Management (GTM) solutions. It was acquired by E2open in 2019.

Amber Road was headquartered in East Rutherford, New Jersey, with its European headquarters in Munich, Germany. The company had offices in Tysons Corner, VA and Raleigh, NC in the United States, Hong Kong, Shanghai and Shenzhen (China), as well as Bangalore (India).

History 
The company was founded in 1990 by James and John Preuninger under the name of Management Dynamics in the USA. In 2011, the company was renamed Amber Road.

Their Europe, the Middle East and Africa headquarters was opened in Munich during 2013 and the company was listed on the New York Stock Exchange in 2014.

Amber Road was acquired by E2open for $425 million in 2019.

Product 
Amber Road develops and programs Global Trade Management solutions, which are offered as Software as a Service. The task of Global Trade Management software is to ensure transparency and automation in foreign trade and supply chain management.

See also 

 International trade
 Supply chain management
 Software as a service

References

External links 
 

Defunct software companies of the United States
Companies formerly listed on the New York Stock Exchange
1990 establishments in New Jersey
American companies established in 1990
Companies based in Bergen County, New Jersey
East Rutherford, New Jersey
2014 initial public offerings
2019 mergers and acquisitions
1990 establishments in the United States
Software companies established in 1990
Software companies disestablished in 2019
2019 disestablishments in New Jersey